The men's featherweight event was part of the boxing programme at the 1956 Summer Olympics.  The weight class was allowed boxers of up to 57 kilograms to compete. The competition was held from 23 November to 1 December 1956. 18 boxers from 18 nations competed.

Medalists

Results

First round
 Pentti Hämäläinen (FIN) def. Martin Smyth (IRL), RSC
 Bernard Schröter (GDR) def. Paulino Meléndres (PHI), PTS

Second round
 Henryk Niedźwiedzki (POL) def. Leonard Leisching (RSA), PTS
 Tristán Falfán (ARG) def. Maurice White (PAK), RSC-2
 Vladimir Safronov (URS) def. Agostino Cossia (ITA), PTS
 André de Souza (FRA) def. Nontasilp Thayansilp (THA), PTS
 Shinichiro Suzuki (JPN) def. Yaichit Wang (BUR), PTS
 Thomas Nicholls (GBR) def. Noel Hazard (AUS), PTS
 Jan Zachara (TCH) def. Dong-Hun Chung (KOR), PTS
 Pentti Hämäläinen (FIN) def. Bernard Schröter (GDR), PTS

Quarterfinals
 Henryk Niedźwiedzki (POL) def. Tristan Falfán (ARG), RTD-1
 Vladimir Safronov (URS) def. Andre de Souza (FRA), PTS
 Thomas Nicholls (GBR) def. Shinetsu Suzuki (JPN), PTS
 Pentti Hämäläinen (FIN) def. Jan Zachara (TCH), PTS

Semifinals
 Vladimir Safronov (URS) def. Henryk Niedźwiedzki (POL), PTS
 Thomas Nicholls (GBR) def. Pentti Hämäläinen (FIN), PTS

Final
 Vladimir Safronov (URS) def. Thomas Nicholls (GBR), PTS

References

 https://web.archive.org/web/20080912181829/http://www.la84foundation.org/6oic/OfficialReports/1956/OR1956.pdf

Featherweight